John Rankine (1918–2013) was a British science fiction author.

John Rankine may also refer to:
John Rankine (politician) (1801–1864), Colonial Australian landowner and politician 
John Rankine (moderator) (1816–1885) Scottish minister
John Rankine (legal author) (1846–1922), Scottish jurist 
John Rankine (colonial administrator) (1907–1987), 1st Governor of Western Nigeria, Acting Governor of Fiji

See also
John Rankin (disambiguation)